A Combat Logistics Company (CLC) is a logistics unit of the United States Marine Corps that are based at Marine Corps air stations. Formerly known as Combat Service Support Companies, they provide intermediate supply support and intermediate motor transport and engineer ground equipment maintenance to their Marine Aircraft Wings (MAWs); operate the Aerial Port of Embarkation/Debarkation (APOE/D) under the guidance of the Marine Expeditionary Force (MEF); and provide personnel to the Fleet Assistance Program (FAP) in support of legal, postal, exchange, security (military police), personnel administration, freight/passenger transportation (TMO) and bulk fuel support for their respective Marine Corps Air Station.

Organization 
Combat Logistics Companies fall under the command of a Combat Logistics Regiment within the Marine Logistics Group. Companies are not provided to air stations in proximity to a larger logistics unit (such as Marine Corps Air Station Camp Pendleton).

Combat Logistics Companies provide intermediate ground logistics support to aviation units, to include supply and maintenance beyond organic capabilities.

List of Combat Logistics Companies

See also 

 United States Marine Corps aviation
 Organization of the United States Marine Corps
 List of United States Marine Corps aviation support units
 Logistics Combat Element

References 

United States Marine Corps aviation
United States Marine Corps aviation support squadrons
United States military-related lists